Perigonica is a genus of moths of the family Noctuidae.

Species
 Perigonica angulata Smith, 1890
 Perigonica eldana Smith, 1911
 Perigonica fulminans Smith, 1890
 Perigonica pectinata (Smith, 1888) (syn: Perigonica johnstoni (McDunnough, 1943))
 Perigonica tertia Dyar, 1903 (syn: Perigonica fermata Smith, 1911)

References
Natural History Museum Lepidoptera genus database
Perigonica at funet

Orthosiini